I-4K is a satellite bus being developed by Indian Space Research Organisation (ISRO). It will be a standard bus for  class communication satellites; the I in I-4K stands for INSAT, a group of communication satellites developed and launched by ISRO. The I-4K spacecraft bus can supply DC power of 10 to 15 kilowatts.

List of satellites being developed with I-4K bus
 GSAT series

See also

 Comparison of satellite buses

References 

Indian Space Research Organisation
Satellite buses